The 2022 CONCACAF Under-20 Championship was the 7th edition of the CONCACAF Under-20 Championship (28th edition if all eras included), the men's under-20 international football tournament organized by CONCACAF. It was held in Honduras, in the cities of San Pedro Sula and Tegucigalpa.

On 16 September 2021, a new format was announced: the sixteen member associations ranked 1st to 16th would qualify for the group stage while the remaining nineteen member associations (all ranked 17th and below in the CONCACAF men’s under-20 rankings) would have to play in the 2022 CONCACAF U-20 Championship qualifying tournament to qualify for the knockout stage. The qualifying tournament took place from 5 to 13 November 2021 in Santo Domingo, Dominican Republic.

The competition determined not only the four CONCACAF representatives at the 2023 FIFA U-20 World Cup in Indonesia and at the 2023 Pan American Games men's football tournament in Chile, but also the two CONCACAF representatives at the 2024 Summer Olympics in France.

The United States were the defending champions of the competition, since they were the champions in the 2018 edition and the 2020 edition was cancelled due to the COVID-19 pandemic. The United States once again successfully defended the title, defeating the biggest surprise of the tournament Dominican Republic 6–0 in the final for their third CONCACAF U-20 Championship title.

Qualified teams

Twenty national teams participated in the tournament: the sixteen best ranked national teams (based on the CONCACAF men’s under-20 rankings), that qualified directly to the tournament, plus four national teams qualified through the 2021 CONCACAF U-20 Championship qualifying.

Notes

Venues
On 24 February 2022, CONCACAF confirmed three stadiums for the tournament.

During the competition Estadio Yankel Rosenthal was used as a provisional venue due to problems with the playing pitch at Estadio Morazán caused by very heavy rainfall in San Pedro Sula. Some matches were relocated to the Estadio Olímpico and Estadio Yankel Rosenthal.

Squads

Players born on or after 1 January 2003 were eligible to compete. Each team had to register a squad of 20 players, two of whom had to be goalkeepers.

Draw
The draw for the tournament was held on 3 March 2022, 12:00 AST (UTC−4), at the CONCACAF Headquarters in Miami, Florida. The 16 teams which entered the group stage were drawn into four groups of four teams. Based on the CONCACAF Men's Under-20 Ranking, the 16 teams were distributed into four pots, with teams in Pot 1 assigned to each group prior to the draw, as follows:

Group stage
The top three teams in each group advanced to the round of 16, where they were joined by the four teams advancing from the 2021 CONCACAF U-20 Championship qualifying.

Tiebreakers
The ranking of teams in each group was determined as follows (Regulations Article 12.7):
Points obtained in all group matches (three points for a win, one for a draw, zero for a loss).
Goal difference in all group matches.
Number of goals scored in all group matches.
Points obtained in the matches played between the teams in question.
Goal difference in the matches played between the teams in question.
Number of goals scored in the matches played between the teams in question.
Fair play points in all group matches (only one deduction could be applied to a player in a single match):
Yellow card: −1 point
Indirect red card (second yellow card): −3 points
Direct red card: −4 points
Yellow card and direct red card: −5 points
Drawing of lots.

All times are local, CST (UTC−6).

Group E

Group F

Group G

Group H

Knockout stage
In the knockout stage, if a match was level at the end of normal playing time, extra time was played (two periods of 15 minutes each) and followed, if necessary, by a penalty shoot-out to determine the winners.

Qualified directly to the knockout stage 
Qualified from 2022 CONCACAF U-20 Championship qualifying
 
 
 
 

Bracket

Round of 16

Quarter-finals
Winners qualified for 2023 FIFA U-20 World Cup.

Semi-finals
Winners qualified for the 2024 Summer Olympic men's football tournament.

Final

Awards

Winners

Individual awards
The following awards were given at the conclusion of the tournament.

Goalscorers

Qualification for international tournaments

Qualified teams for FIFA U-20 World Cup
The following four teams from CONCACAF qualified for the 2023 FIFA U-20 World Cup in Indonesia.

1 Bold indicates champions for that year. Italic indicates hosts for that year.

Qualified teams for Summer Olympics
Unlike the previous editions, the tournament also served as qualifier for the 2024 Summer Olympic men's football tournament. This was changed from the previous set-up where the CONCACAF representatives qualify for the Olympic football tournament through their Pre-Olympic Tournament-

The following two teams from CONCACAF qualified for 2024 Summer Olympic men's football tournament in France.

1 Bold indicates champions for that year. Italic indicates hosts for that year.

Qualified teams for Pan American Games
The champion team and the top team from each of the three CONCACAF zones, i.e., Caribbean (CFU), Central American (UNCAF), and North American (NAFU), qualified for the 2023 Pan American Games men's football tournament.

The following four teams from CONCACAF qualified for the 2023 Pan American Games men's football tournament in Chile.

2 Bold indicates champions for that year. Italic indicates hosts for that year.

Notes
At the end of the match between the United States and Costa Rica, violent and unsportsmanlike actions were reported. The Costa Rican Football Federation has been sanctioned with a fine and nine of its players were temporarily suspended due to infraction of the Competition Regulations and the FIFA Disciplinary Code. Likewise, one U.S. player was suspended and banned for the remainder of the competition.

References

External links
Under 20s – Men, CONCACAF.com

 
2022
U-20 Championship
2022 in youth association football
2021–22 in Honduran football
2023 FIFA U-20 World Cup qualification
International association football competitions hosted by Honduras
CONCACAF
CONCACAF
Football at the 2024 Summer Olympics – Men's qualification
Qualification tournaments for the 2023 Pan American Games